Charles Henry Martin (October 1, 1863September 22, 1946) was an American Army officer and later politician in the state of Oregon. A native of Illinois, he had a 40-year career in the military including serving in conflicts from the Spanish–American War to World War I before retiring as a major general. A Democrat, he was the U.S. representative for Oregon's 3rd congressional district from 1931 to 1935 and then was the state's 21st governor from 1935 to 1939.

Biography

Early life

Charles Martin was born near Albion, Illinois, on October 1, 1863. He attended Ewing College (Ewing, Illinois) for two years until he was appointed to the U.S. Military Academy. He would actively serve in the Spanish–American War, Philippine–American War, and Boxer Rebellion after graduating from West Point in 1887. In 1920, when the army's authority to maintain Jim Crow regulations seemed threatened, Martin wrote that "the negro is of very little importance... the average negro is not by any means equal to the average white man."

Martin was later a division commander of the famous Blackhawk Division and the U.S. V Corps in the Argonne during World War I and served as the U.S. Army Assistant Chief of Staff from 1922 to 1924. He was honored with the Distinguished Service Medal and two citations for bravery in action and retired from the Army as a major general on October 1, 1927, after commanding the Panama Canal Department for three years. His DSM citation reads:

Congressman and Governor

Martin embarked on his second career after retiring to Portland, Oregon with his wife. From March 4, 1931, to January 3, 1935, he served as a conservative Democratic Representative to the U.S. Congress from Oregon's Third Congressional District.

Martin was elected governor in 1934, during a time of intense labor turmoil and the middle of the Great Depression, earning a reputation for restoring state finances. The major issues that Martin dealt with during his time in office were economic recovery from the Great Depression, reconstruction of the Oregon State Capitol, the planning and construction of the Bonneville Dam, and the development of statewide port and highway infrastructures. When the Depression eased, he opposed the full restoration of wage levels for state employees, who had suffered a 50 percent pay cut.

Martin became known as a pro-business governor in early May 1935 when timber workers began to strike, declaring, "These pestiferous peewees would go to any lengths to embarrass me and my administration." In private correspondence and public appearances he railed against the National Labor Relations Board, declared union organizers to be gangsters and Bolsheviks, and considered Secretary of Labor Frances Perkins to be the head "red" in the Roosevelt administration.  Martin threatened to fire Columbia County Sheriff Oscar Weed for not responding harshly enough to striking workers, instructing the state's sheriffs to "beat hell out of 'em!" and "crack their damn heads! Those fellows are there for nothing but trouble – give it to them!" On May 23, 1935, Martin ordered the state police and National Guard to protect strikebreakers at the Stimson Mill strike in the Washington County town of Gaston. The National Guard was again called out to harass, intimidate, and arrest striking longshoremen in 1937.

Martin grew in his vocal opposition to Roosevelt's New Deal, especially to the National Labor Relations Board (NLRB) and the President's labor policy. In 1937, the NLRB failed to settle a jurisdictional dispute between the Congress of Industrial Organizations (CIO) and the American Federation of Labor (AFL) that had closed all Portland sawmills. Martin stepped in and held his own elections, which led to the reopening of the mills. He made himself the enemy of what many saw as corrupt labor leaders, particularly by his appointment of Assistant Attorney General Ralph E. Moody to prosecute many union people accused of arson and assault.

He was often quoted for his rephrasing of President Roosevelt's famous pronouncement on fear, saying, "We have nothing to fear from the future except our own foolishness and slothfulness." His criticism of President Roosevelt, however, cost Martin a bitterly contested bid for the Democratic Party of Oregon's gubernatorial nomination in 1938.

Death and legacy
After losing the nomination, Martin retired from active politics to his Portland home. He died on September 22, 1946, and was interred at River View Cemetery in Portland.

Footnotes

Further reading
 Alfred F. Gunns, Civil Liberties in Crisis: The Pacific Northwest, 1917–1940. New York: Garland Publishing Co., 1983.
 Gary Murrell, "Hunting Reds in Oregon, 1935–1939," Oregon Historical Quarterly, vol. 100, no. 4 (Winter 1999), pp. 374–401. In JSTOR
 Gary Murrell, Iron Pants: Oregon's Anti-New Deal Governor, Charles Henry Martin. Pullman, WA: Washington State University Press, 2000.

External links

 Official biography from State of Oregon website

Democratic Party governors of Oregon
United States Military Academy alumni
1863 births
1946 deaths
United States Army generals of World War I
Burials at River View Cemetery (Portland, Oregon)
Democratic Party members of the United States House of Representatives from Oregon
United States Army generals
People from Albion, Illinois
Military personnel from Illinois